The Malagasy mabuya (Trachylepis madagascariensis) is a species of skink found in Madagascar.

References

Trachylepis
Reptiles described in 1908
Taxa named by François Mocquard